Meluawati (later Meiluawati; born May 25, 1975) is an Indonesian born former world-class badminton player who represented Indonesia and later the United States.

Career
Meluawati was a member of Indonesia's world champion 1996 Uber Cup (women's international) team, winning her final round match against China's future World and Olympic champion Zhang Ning. She was also a member of the 1998 Indonesian Uber Cup team which finished second to China. In individual competition she won women's singles at the Polish Open in 1996 and was women's singles runner-up to the formidable Susi Susanti at the 1997 Indonesia Open.

Playing for the United States in the early 2000s, Meluawati won consecutive U.S. National women's singles titles in 2001, 2002, and 2003; and women's doubles in 2001 and 2003. She also won women's singles at the Pan American Championships in 2001.

Achievements

Pan Am Championships 

Women's singles

Southeast Asian Games 
Women's singles

World Junior Championships 
The Bimantara World Junior Championships was an international invitation badminton tournament for junior players. It was held in Jakarta, Indonesia from 1987 to 1991.

Girls' singles

IBF World Grand Prix 
The World Badminton Grand Prix was sanctioned by the International Badminton Federation from 1983 to 2006.

Women's singles

IBF International

Women's singles

Women's doubles

References

Indonesian female badminton players
American female badminton players
1975 births
Living people
Place of birth missing (living people)
Asian Games medalists in badminton
Badminton players at the 1998 Asian Games
Asian Games bronze medalists for Indonesia
Southeast Asian Games medalists in badminton
Southeast Asian Games gold medalists for Indonesia
Southeast Asian Games silver medalists for Indonesia
Medalists at the 1998 Asian Games
Competitors at the 1997 Southeast Asian Games